The 1970 1. divisjon was the 26th completed season of top division football in Norway.

Overview
It was contested by 10 teams, and Strømsgodset won the championship, their first league title.

Teams and locations
''Note: Table lists in alphabetical order.

League table

Results

Season statistics

Top scorer
 Steinar Pettersen, Strømsgodset – 16 goals

Attendances

References
Norway - List of final tables (RSSSF)
Norsk internasjonal fotballstatistikk (NIFS)

Eliteserien seasons
Norway
Norway
1